The Iarcoș is a right tributary of the river Timiș in Romania. It discharges into the Timiș near Dragșina.

References

Rivers of Romania
Rivers of Timiș County